Eleonore von Kropiwnicki was an Austrian swimmer. She competed in the women's 4 × 100 metre freestyle relay at the 1936 Summer Olympics. Von Kropiwnicki was in the women's 4 × 100 metre freestyle relay with Grete Ittlinger, Franziska Mally and Roma Wagner and they failed to make the first three, and the finals, by coming last in the first semi-final.

References

External links
 

Year of birth missing
Possibly living people
Olympic swimmers of Austria
Swimmers at the 1936 Summer Olympics
Place of birth missing
Austrian female freestyle swimmers